Chaudhary Bhupendra Singh is an Indian Politician who is the current and 14th state president of Bharatiya Janata Party in Uttar Pradesh and cabinet minister for Panchayati Raj in Uttar Pradesh Government . He hails from Moradabad in Western UP.

On 10 June 2016, he was elected to the Uttar Pradesh Legislative Council.

Early life 
Bhupendra Singh was born in Mahendra Sikanderpur village in the Thana Chajalat area of Moradabad district in 1966 to a Jat farmer family.  He passed the 12th examination from RN Inter College, Moradabad.

Early Political Career 
Bhupendra Singh joined the Vishwa Hindu Parishad as a student leader and went on to join the BJP in 1991. Two years later, in 1993, he became a member of the BJP's district executive. In 2006, he was made the regional minister of Moradabad by the BJP and was made the regional chief of the party in 2012.

References

Further reading
 http://www.patrika.com/news/moradabad/bjp-leader-bhupinder-singh-elected-mlc-1321851/
 http://epaper.amarujala.com/mc/20160613/08.html?clip=68967
 http://www.uniindia.com/bjp-fields-rn-singh-for-biennial-elections-to-mah-state-legislative-council/india/news/503061.html
 http://www.bhaskar.com/news/UP-LUCK-uttar-pradesh-mlc-election-voting-5345578-NOR.html?seq=2

Living people
Members of the Uttar Pradesh Legislative Council
Politicians from Moradabad
Yogi ministry
Bharatiya Janata Party politicians from Uttar Pradesh
1968 births